Planciusdalen is a valley in Gustav V Land at Nordaustlandet, Svalbard. It is a continuation of the bay Planciusbukta, and stretches southwards to Rijpfjorden. The valley is named after Dutch cartographer Petrus Plancius.

References

Valleys of Svalbard
Nordaustlandet